Dr. C. Krishnan (born 7 June 1936) is a member of the 14th Lok Sabha of India. He represents the Pollachi constituency of Tamil Nadu and is a member of the Marumalarchi Dravida Munnetra Kazhagam (MDMK) political party.

References

Living people
Indian Tamil people
Lok Sabha members from Tamil Nadu
1936 births
India MPs 2004–2009
India MPs 1999–2004
Marumalarchi Dravida Munnetra Kazhagam politicians
People from Coimbatore district